Charlotte Creek is a river located in Delaware County, New York. Charlotte Creek borders the southern border of Otsego County, New York for a few miles near the mouth. The creek converges with the Susquehanna River by Emmons, New York.

Tributaries 
Dona Brook flows into Charlotte Creek west of Davenport. Crawford Brook flows into Charlotte Creek northeast of Davenport Center.

See also
List of rivers of New York

References

Rivers of New York (state)
Rivers of Otsego County, New York
Rivers of Delaware County, New York
Rivers of Schoharie County, New York